Zeki Şahin (born 17 October 1965) is a Turkish wrestler. He competed in the men's Greco-Roman 62 kg at the 1988 Summer Olympics.

References

External links
 

1965 births
Living people
Turkish male sport wrestlers
Olympic wrestlers of Turkey
Wrestlers at the 1988 Summer Olympics
Place of birth missing (living people)